Siniša Babić (born 13 February 1991) is a Serbian football forward who plays for Uzbekistani club Turon Yaypan.

Club career
Born in Novi Sad, Babić is a product of Vojvodina's youth school. After youth career, he was loaned to Palić, and Veternik. After one season as a loaned player, he was brought from Vojvodina and continued playing for Veternik. Later he played for Proleter Novi Sad next three seasons. He returned in Vojvodina in summer 2015.
On 23 August 2017, Babić signed a contract with Super League club AEL for an undisclosed fee. At the beginning of 2018, Babić signed with Radnički Niš.

Career statistics

References

External links
 Siniša Babić stats at utakmica.rs
 
 

1991 births
Footballers from Novi Sad
Living people
Serbian footballers
Association football forwards
FK Vojvodina players
FK Palić players
FK Slavija Sarajevo players
FK Veternik players
FK Proleter Novi Sad players
Athlitiki Enosi Larissa F.C. players
FK Radnički Niš players
FK Krupa players
Serbian First League players
Serbian SuperLiga players
Super League Greece players
Premier League of Bosnia and Herzegovina players
Uzbekistan Super League players
Serbian expatriate footballers
Serbian expatriate sportspeople in Greece
Expatriate footballers in Greece
Serbian expatriate sportspeople in Bosnia and Herzegovina
Expatriate footballers in Bosnia and Herzegovina
Serbian expatriate sportspeople in Uzbekistan
Expatriate footballers in Uzbekistan